"I Like" is a song by American R&B group Guy recorded for their debut studio album Guy (1988). The song was released as the album's fourth single in 1989. The album version clocks at 4:54 while the single was 12-inch only and was composed entirely of edits.

The song peaked at number seventy on the Billboard Hot 100 chart.

Track listing
12", 33 RPM, vinyl
"I Like" (Extended Version) – 8:17
"I Like" (Radio Edit) – 5:40
"I Like" (Hype Version) – 4:50
"I Like" (Dub Version) – 4:45

12" vinyl
"I Like" (Extended Version) – 8:17
"I Like" (Acapella) – 4:02
"I Like" (Radio Edit) – 5:40
"I Like" (Instrumental) – 4:55
"I Like" (Hype Mix) – 4:50
"I Like" (Dub Version) – 4:45

Personnel
Information taken from Discogs.
Arranging – Teddy Riley
Background arranging – Teddy Riley
Engineering – Dennis Mitchell
Executive production – Guy
Guitar overdubbing – Bernard Bell
Production – Teddy Riley
Remix engineering – Dennis Mitchell
Remixing – Teddy Riley
Writing – Timothy Gatling, Aaron Hall, Teddy Riley

Charts

Weekly charts

Year-end charts

References

1989 singles
Guy (band) songs
Song recordings produced by Teddy Riley
Songs written by Teddy Riley
1988 songs
Songs written by Aaron Hall (singer)
Uptown Records singles
Songs written by Timmy Gatling